6793 Palazzolo, provisional designation , is a stony asteroid from the middle region of the asteroid belt, approximately 9 kilometers in diameter. It was discovered on 30 December 1991, by Italian amateur astronomers Ulisse Quadri and Luca Strabla at the Bassano Bresciano Observatory in northern Italy. The asteroid was named after the Italian city of Palazzolo sull'Oglio.

Orbit and classification 

Palazzolo orbits the Sun in the central main-belt at a distance of 2.3–3.1 AU once every 4 years and 5 months (1,603 days). Its orbit has an eccentricity of 0.16 and an inclination of 5° with respect to the ecliptic.

Physical characteristics 

Palazzolo is an assumed S-type asteroid.

Rotation period 

In 2012, a rotational lightcurve of Palazzolo was obtained from  photometric observations at the Palomar Transient Factory in California. Lightcurve analysis gave a rotation period of  hours with a brightness amplitude of 0.16 in magnitude.

Diameter and albedo 

According to the survey carried out by the NEOWISE mission of NASA's space-based Wide-field Infrared Survey Explorer, Palazzolo has a diameter of 9.9 kilometers and an albedo of 0.083, while the Collaborative Asteroid Lightcurve Link assumes an albedo of 0.10 and calculates a diameter of 8.0 kilometers.

Naming 

This minor planet is named after the Italian city of Palazzolo sull'Oglio, located between Brescia and Bergamo, in northern parts of the country. Known for its industries, including the first Italian factories producing cement and buttons, the city is now famous for its of spinning machines and zippers. It was founded on the banks of river Oglio, with archaeological findings dating back to the Roman era. The approved naming citation was published by the Minor Planet Center on 4 April 1996.

References

External links 
 Asteroid Lightcurve Database (LCDB), query form (info )
 Dictionary of Minor Planet Names, Google books
 Asteroids and comets rotation curves, CdR – Observatoire de Genève, Raoul Behrend
 Discovery Circumstances: Numbered Minor Planets (5001)-(10000) – Minor Planet Center
 
 

006793
006793
006793
Named minor planets
19911230